Thropp and Harding were surveyors and an architectural practice in Lincoln working from 1 James Street and  29 Broadgate, Lincoln. James  Thropp  was  initially in partnership with James Sandby Padley until 1881 He then worked on his own until 1901.  Between 1891 and 1896, the Lincoln architect Herbert Henry Dunn was his assistant  and at  the same time, 1891–6,  George Robinson Harding, was  articled to him. In 1901 Thropp and Harding formed a partnership which was dissolved in Oct 1921. The architectural practice continued under Harding until after the Second World War. Thropp was a member of the Institute of Civil Engineers and was surveyor to the Lindsey County Council. In 1883 Thropp published a 3rd edition of Padley's large scale survey of Lincoln. James Thropp of 27 Bailgate died 8 September 1923

Work of Thropp and Harding
Apart from work for the Lindsey County Council, Thropp also laid out new streets in Lincoln and designed terraced houses and villas. 

Police Headquarters Quarters and Magistrates Court, High Street East, Scunthorpe. 1894 Brick and stone, Jacobean, with exceedingly tall polygonal chimneys. Later Ukrainian Church of the Holy Cross.
49 Yarborough Road, Lincoln. 1896. Brick terrace house with extensive  use of decorative artificial stonework.
7 Greetwell Road, Lincoln. 1901.  Notable Queen Anne Style house with tile hanging designed by Thropp and Harding for the Rev. Walter Hicks.

Further reading
 Antonia Brodie (ed) Directory of British Architects, 1834–1914: 2 Vols, British Architectural Library, Royal Institute of British Architects, 2001
Antram N (revised), Pevsner N & Harris J, (1989), The Buildings of England: Lincolnshire, Yale University Press.

References

Architecture firms based in Lincoln
19th-century English architects
Architects from Lincolnshire
Companies based in Lincoln, England